Qasim Ali Umar (born 9 February 1957) is a Kenyan-born Pakistani former cricketer. He was the first Black Pakistani cricketer who played in 26 Tests and 31 ODIs between 1983 and 1987 for the Pakistani national cricket team before getting banned for admitting his involvement in the spot fixing.

Umar played his cricket both as an opening batsman as well as with the ability to bat anywhere in the middle order. He matriculated from the prestigious private boys' school, St Paul's English High School, on a cricket scholarship in 1974.

Born in Kenya, he migrated to Pakistan with his family in 1957. His mother was Kenyan, and due to his East African features, he was often mistaken as a member of the Sheedi community.

After ban, he left Pakistan to settle down in Manchester, United Kingdom.

In 2018, KMC named a fly-over near National Stadium, Karachi.

Controversies
In 1985–86 he became the first player to make claims on the impact of recreational and performance-enhancing drugs in cricket.

Umar also accepted gifts and accused his teammates of indulging in sexual relations with prostitutes in return for underperforming in certain matches.

International awards

One-Day International Cricket

Man of the Match awards

See also
 List of Test cricketers born in non-Test playing nations

References
Cricinfo Bio

1957 births
Living people
Pakistan Test cricketers
Pakistan One Day International cricketers
Cumberland cricketers
Karachi cricketers
Sindh cricketers
Pakistani cricketers
Cricketers from Nairobi
Sind B cricketers
Karachi Whites cricketers
Karachi Blues cricketers
Sind A cricketers
Muslim Commercial Bank cricketers
Pakistan Starlets cricketers
Kenyan people of Pakistani descent
Pakistani people of Kenyan descent
Pakistani emigrants to the United Kingdom
Cricketers banned for corruption
Pakistani Muslims
Kenyan emigrants to Pakistan